Ethnicity & Health is a bimonthly peer-reviewed medical journal covering the relationship between ethnicity and health. It publishes papers pertaining to this topic in numerous different disciplines, including epidemiology, public health, medicine, and the social sciences. The editor-in-chief is Tamara A. Baker (University of Kansas). According to the Journal Citation Reports, the journal has a 2017 impact factor of 1.766.

References

External links

Taylor & Francis academic journals
Publications established in 1996
Bimonthly journals
English-language journals
Healthcare journals